Princess Hwahyeop, or Princess Hwahyop (Hangul: 화협옹주, Hanja: 和協翁主) (1733 – 1752) was the seventh daughter of King Yeongjo of the Joseon dynasty in Korea.

Biography
The princess' personal name is unknown. She was born to Lady Seonhui of the Jeonui Lee clan on the 7th day of the 3rd lunar month, 1733. She received the official title Princess Hwahyeop, meaning harmony in 1739 by an official decree. Her capping ceremony took place in 1743, the 19th year of King Yeongjo's reign. In the same year, she married Sin Gwang-su (Hangul: 신광수, Hanja: 申光绥), the second son of Minister Sin Man (Hangul: 신만, Hanja: 申晚) from the Pyeongsan Sin Clan (평산신씨，平山申氏).

Princess Hwahyeop was renowned for her beauty and exceptional devotion to her parents, but it is reported that King Yeongjo disliked her due to his disappointment that she was not a male child. In the memoirs of Lady Hyegyong, it is said that King Yeongjo forbade Princess Hwahyeop to stay under the same roof as him and would get rid of his inauspiciousness by pouring water, which he used to wash his ears in front of Princess Hwahyeop's residence. When she got married, it was even reported that he was cold to her husband.

Similarly disfavored by their father, Prince Sado had a special affinity for Princess Hwahyeop. He was attentive to her, and, during her illness, sent one servant after another to inquire about her. When Princess Hwahyeop died, he mourned for her with real sorrow. His grief was expressed in his eulogy dedicated to her.

Sometimes in the 10th month of 1750, there was a large epidemics of measles in the capital. Princess Hwahyeop was the first to come down with it. She subsequently died of measles on the 27th day of the 11th lunar month, 1752, at the age of 19. She did not conceive any child but has an adopted son Sin Jaesan (Hangul: 신재선, Hanja: 申在善), an off-spring from Sin Gwang-su's distant cousin.

Tomb
Princess Hwahyeop's tomb was discovered in August 2015, in Sampae-dong, Namyangju, Gyonggi-do (京畿道南杨州市三牌洞). This was the original burial site of the Princess with her husband Sin Gwang-su. In the 1970s, the coffins of the couple was shifted to another burial site in Jingeon-myeon (真乾邑), Namyangju, by their descendants for an unknown reason. Therefore, only traces of their coffins were found in this original burial site.

Characters carved on stone blocks placed on the right-hand side of the tomb were used to identify its occupant. The characters read: 有明朝鲜和協翁主之墓寅坐 (The burial of Princess Hwahyeop of the Joseon Dynasty). The second excavation in December 2016 unearthed a memorial stone featuring a eulogy dictated by King Yeongjo, a stone chest containing porcelain jars for cosmetics, a bronze mirror, and a wooden comb. The eulogy by King Yeongjo contained a total of 394 characters written on the back, front, and sides of the memorial stone. The eulogy details the king's final visit to his ill daughter on the 25th day of the 11th lunar month, 1752, two days before her death. It has been remarked that it is rare for a Joseon king to inscribe a stone for a daughter, and has been taken as a sign of King Yeongjo's affection for this particular daughter.

Family 
 Great-Great-Grandfather
 King Hyojong (효종대왕, 孝宗大王) (3 July 1619 - 23 June 1659)
 Great-Great-Grandmother
 Queen Inseon of the Deoksu Jang clan (인선왕후 장씨, 仁宣王后 張氏) (9 February 1619 - 19 March 16, 1694)
 Great-Grandfather 
 King Hyeonjong (현종대왕, 顯宗大王) (14 March 1641 - 17 September 1674)
 Great-Grandmother
 Queen Myeongseong of the Cheongpung Kim clan (명성왕후 김씨, 明聖王后 金氏) (13 June 1642 - 12 January 1683)
 Grandfather
 King Sukjong (숙종대왕, 肅宗大王) (7 October 1661 - 12 July 1720)
 Grandmother
 Royal Noble Consort Sukbin of the Haeju Choi clan (화경숙빈 해주 최씨, 和敬淑嬪 海州 崔氏) (17 December 1670 - 9 April 1718)
 Father
 King Yeongjo (영조대왕, 英祖大王) (31 October 1694 - 22 April 1776)
 Mother
 Roble Noble Consort Yeongbin of the Jeonui Lee clan (소유영빈 전의 이씨, 暎嬪 全義 李氏) (15 August 1696 - 23 August 1764)
 Sisters
 Older sister: Princess Hwapyeong (화평옹주, 和平翁主) (27 August 1727 - 24 June 1748)
 Brother-in-law: Park Myeong-won of the Bannam Park clan (금성위 박명원, 錦城尉 朴明源) (본관: 반남 박씨, 潘南 朴氏)
 Adoptive nephew: Park Sang-cheol (박상철, 朴相喆)
 Older sister: Princess Hwadeok (화덕옹주, 和德翁主) (3 August 1728 - 18 February 1731); died young
 Older sister: Unnamed princess (옹주, 翁主) (12 December 1729 - 21 March 1731); died young
 Older sister: Unnamed princess (옹주, 翁主) (1 January 1732 - 12 April 1736); died young
 Younger sister: Princess Hwawan (화완옹주, 和緩翁主) (9 March 1738 - May 1808)
 Brother-in-law: Jeong Chi-dal of the Yeonil Jeong clan (정치달, 鄭致達) (일성위, 日城尉) (본관: 연일 정씨, 延日 鄭氏) (1732 - 1757)
 Adoptive nephew: Jeong Hu-gyeom (정후겸, 鄭厚謙) (1749 - 1776); second son of Jeong Seok-dal (정석달, 鄭錫達)
 Niece: Lady Jeong (정씨, 鄭氏) (3 August 1756 - 23 January 1757) (본관: 연일 정씨, 延日 鄭氏)
 Brothers
 Older half-brother: Crown Prince Hyojang (효장세자, 孝章世子) (4 April 1719 - 16 December 1728)
 Younger brother: Crown Prince Sado (사도세자, 莊祖大王) (13 February 1735 - 12 July 1762)
 Sister-in-law: Lady Hyegyeong of the Pungsan Hong clan (혜경궁 풍산 홍씨, 惠慶宮 豊山 洪氏) (6 August 1735 - 13 January 1816)
 Husband
 Sin Gwang-su of the Pyeongsan Sin clan (영성위 신광수, 永城尉 申光綏) (1731- 1775) (본관: 평산 신씨, 平山 申氏)
 Father-in-law: Sin Man (의정부 영의정 효정공 신만, 議政府 領議政 孝正公 申晩) (1703 - 1765)
 Uncle-in-law: Sin Ui
 Son
 Adoptive son: Sin Jae-seon (신재선, 申在善)

Eulogies
 

The Royal Epitaph of Princess Hwahyeop, buried in PyongChang Village, Geumgok (Yangju)

My seventh daughter was born of Yeongbin Yi Ssi ( Lady Seonhui) on the 7th day of the 3rd lunar month of 1733 in the royal palace. She received capping ceremony in 1739 and married Yongsong-Wi Sin Gwang-su, son of Minister Sin Man, at the age of 11. She left her maiden home in the 7th lunar month of 1747 and passed away on the 27th day of the 11th lunar month in 1752 at her residence located in Daesa-dong (modern day Insa-dong). She was composed in disposition and beautiful in appearance, genuine to her kins and devoted to her father-in-law. Despite growing up in the troubling palace, Hwahyeop remained tranquil and distant herself from affairs. What remarkable character! Else, how was she able to command respect of the servants and had all mourned wholeheartedly at her passing? Even I was impressed by her sincerity. I could still vividly recall the events on my visit to her on the 25th day (of the 11th month) last winter. Having heard the news of my visit, Hwahyeop had her chamberlains prepared food for me and sent them to me to inquire. She thought for me despite being critically ill. What a considerate daughter she was! I deeply lament the events that day. While awaiting my arrival, Hwahyeop suddenly felt breathless. She was weeping, "I am going to fail my father" before losing consciousness. Repeating three times, I said to her, "I'm about to return to my place". Having no response from her, I came back to my place in tears. I heard from a doctor the following day that Hwahyeop regained her consciousness and asked her chamberlains why they didn’t wake her up, expressing her regret of not having been able to say her regard to me. Hearing that, tears ran down my face without my knowledge. I was told that she was planning to come and see me but it was already too late. I am overwhelmed by sorrow. On the 22nd day of the 1st month in the following year, Hwayeop was buried in the plains of Geumgok, Yangju. It saddens me even more to think that she had not had a descendant yet. I will select a child from the Sin family to continue her line. In grief, I penned this draft to console her passing soul. Writing down the story line by line, I cannot hold back my tears. I feel unbearably sad.
    

Eulogy written for the sacrificial ritual of Princess Hwahyeop

The 15th day of the 12th lunar month of 1752 in the second hour (sometimes between 1-3AM). Your younger brother, the Crown Prince, had ladies-in-waiting sent offerings to Princess Hwahyeop. My elder sister was virtuous and chaste. She was born into the royal family and had grew up (with me) in the palace. She lived to see twenty springs till one frosty snow took her to join the immortals. Who would have expected this? Now I have rarely seen the wild geese flying across the sky. I could not believe that what had started as a minor illness would end up incurable. Mother and I had been anxious (over your deteriorating health) day and night. You were sincere and filial till the end of your journey. Upon hearing that His Majesty was about to visit you, you rose from your sick bed. But your words drifted like flowing water and faded away with time. My grief is merely expressed through these humble offerings. Your virtue will be remembered as lingering fragrance. 
   

Eulogy written on the visit to Princess Hwahyeop's Tomb

Lamenting my aunt, how was she not virtuous and gentle? I have often heard about her kindness towards her brother. Flowing along the path to the tomb is a beautiful river. Precious stones concealing beneath shimmering waters. I passed by in a carriage and wrote this short text in place of the libation of wine.

Ancestry

References

See also
History of Korea
Joseon Dynasty

1733 births
1752 deaths
History of Korea
18th-century Korean people
Princesses of Joseon
18th-century Korean women